Aikawa Katsuroku (1891–1973) was a Japanese Home Ministry government official and politician. He was born in Saga Prefecture. He graduated from the University of Tokyo. He was governor of Miyazaki Prefecture (1937–1939), Hiroshima (1939–1941), Aichi Prefecture (1941–1942) and Ehime Prefecture (1943–1944). He was minister of health and welfare in the Government of Japan (1945).

1891 births
1973 deaths
Japanese Home Ministry government officials
Governors of Aichi Prefecture
Governors of Ehime Prefecture
Governors of Hiroshima
Governors of Miyazaki Prefecture
Ministers of Health and Welfare of Japan
University of Tokyo alumni
People from Saga Prefecture